Julieta Morales is a sector in the city of Santo Domingo in the Distrito Nacional of the Dominican Republic. This sector is populated in particular by individuals from the upper middle class.

Sources 
Distrito Nacional sectors

Populated places in Santo Domingo